Flynt is a surname.

Flynt may also refer to:

Flynt Building, Chandler, Oklahoma, USA; an NHRP-listed building
Flynt Quarry, Monson, Massachusetts, USA; a granite quarry
Flynt Publications, which runs the Hustler adult entertainment empire founded by Larry Flynt

See also

Barbi v. Flynt, where the Barbi Twins sued Larry Flynt and Hustler magazine for unauthorized use of Playboy photos of them
Flynt v Falwell, where Reverend Falwell sued Larry Flynt and Hustler Magazine
The People vs. Larry Flynt, 1996 film directed by Miloš Forman
Melvin Flynt – Da Hustler, the second solo studio album by rapper Noreaga

Hustler (disambiguation), for other Larry Flynt—Hustler topics
Flint (disambiguation)